The 1993–94 season of the Moroccan Throne Cup was the 38th edition of the competition.

Wydad Athletic Club won the cup, beating Olympique de Khouribga 1–0 in the final, played at the Stade Mohamed V in Casablanca. Wydad Athletic Club won the competition for the 6th time in their history.

Competition

Last 16

Quarter-finals

Semi-finals

Final 
The final took place between the two winning semi-finalists, Wydad Athletic Club and Olympique de Khouribga, on 29 September 1994 at the Stade Mohamed V in Casablanca.

Notes and references 

1993
1993 in association football
1994 in association football
1993–94 in Moroccan football